is a JR West station located on the west side of Niimi, Okayama Prefecture, Japan. It offers connecting service to the Geibi and Hakubi Lines.

History
1928-10-25: The completed Hakubi Line is opened, with Bitchū-Kōjiro Station opening at the same time.
1930-02-10: Connected to the Sanshin Line (now the Geibi Line), with service to Yagami Station. Bitchū-Kōjiro Station used to be the busiest station in Niimi, with numerous trains arriving and departing daily. While the station is still busy, many of the trains now go through Niimi Station.
1987-04-01: With the privatization of the Japanese National Railways, Bitchū-Kōjiro Station becomes a JR West station.

Station
Bitchū-Kōjiro Station has three platforms: one next to the station building and two on an island platform, accessible via an overpass over the tracks. The entrance to the station features an old-style gate which is considered a local area treasure. This station is considered the start of the Geibi Line, and official distance for the line starts at zero here.

Platforms
Platform1: Hakubi Line (service to Niimi)
Platform1: Hakubi Line (service to Yonago Station)
Platform 3: Geibi Line (service to Bingo Ochiai and Niimi)

Environs

Services
The Niimi City Shingō Branch Office

Highway access
Route 182
Shingō parking area of the Chūgoku Expressway
Okayama/Tottori Prefectural Route 8, Niimi Nichinan Route

External links
 JR West

Geibi Line
Hakubi Line
Railway stations in Okayama Prefecture
Railway stations in Japan opened in 1928